The neoclassical synthesis (NCS), neoclassical–Keynesian synthesis, or just neo-Keynesianism was a neoclassical economics academic movement and paradigm in economics that worked towards reconciling the macroeconomic thought of John Maynard Keynes in his book The General Theory of Employment, Interest and Money (1936).  It was formulated most notably by John Hicks (1937), Franco Modigliani (1944), and Paul Samuelson (1948), who dominated economics in the post-war period and formed the mainstream of macroeconomic thought in the 1950s, 60s, and 70s.

A series of developments occurred that shook the neoclassical synthesis in the 1970s as the advent of stagflation and the work of monetarists like Milton Friedman cast doubt on neo-Keynesian conceptions of monetary theory. The conditions of the period proved the impossibility of maintaining sustainable growth and low level of inflation via the measures suggested by the school. The result would be a series of new ideas to bring tools to macroeconomic analysis that would be capable of explaining the economic events of the 1970s. Subsequent new Keynesian and new classical economists strived to provide macroeconomics with microeconomic foundations, incorporating traditionally  Keynesian and neoclassical characteristics respectively. These schools eventually came to form a "new neoclassical synthesis", analogous to the neoclassical one, that currently underpins the mainstream of macroeconomic theory.

Main contributors 
John Maynard Keynes provided the framework for synthesizing a host of economic ideas present between 1900 and 1940 and that synthesis bears his name, known as Keynesian economics. The first generation of neo-Keynesians was focused on unifying the ideas into workable paradigms, combining them with ideas from classical economics and the writings of Alfred Marshall. 
Paul Samuelson started the program of neoclassical synthesis, outlining two main objects of study:

 Static theories: equilibrium is described as a result of actions of rational price-taking agents;
 Dynamic theories: price adjustments toward equilibrium after shocks realization, with prices moving in the direction of excess demand functions proportionally to the functions' magnitudes.

Much of neo-Keynesian economic theory was developed by leaders of economic profession, such as John Hicks, Maurice Allais, Franco Modigliani, Paul Samuelson, Alvin Hansen, Lawrence Klein, James Tobin and Don Patinkin. The process began soon after the publication of Keynes' General Theory with the IS-LM model (investment saving–liquidity preference money supply) first presented by John Hicks in a 1937 article. It continued with adaptations of the supply and demand model of markets to Keynesian theory. It represents incentives and costs as playing a pervasive role in shaping decision making. An immediate example of this is the consumer theory of individual demand, which isolates how prices (as costs) and income affect quantity demanded.

The term "neoclassical synthesis" appears to be coined by Paul Samuelson in his influential textbook Economics. According to Samuelson, the neoclassical synthesis should have become a new general economic theory, that could unite positive aspects of previous economic research and become a consensus, over which all members of the economic community believed that the active fiscal and monetary interventions can be used for stabilizing economy and ensuring full employment. Following him, the market economy, based on the reasons described by J. Keynes, cannot provide full employment on its own. But if monetary and fiscal policy is used to tackle underemployment, it will put the economy on a trajectory that applies the principles of classical equilibrium analysis to explain relative prices and resource allocation. The broader neo-Keynesian intellectual program would eventually produce monetarism and other versions of Keynesian macroeconomics in the 1960s.

Main provisions 

 Firms and individuals are considered as largely rational, and their behavior can be studied by standard microeconomic methods.
 Animal spirits still matter; they are perceived as the main source of movements in aggregate demand through investment. 
 Prices and wages do not adjust quickly to clear markets; thus, markets cannot be considered as competitive. 
 There is no automatic labor market equilibrium condition implied, but this equilibrium can be achieved through appropriate monetary and fiscal policies.
 The implication of tâtonnement: prices adjust to excess demand or supply along the lines of the dynamic processes of adjustment suggested by Paul Samuelson in «Foundations of Economic Analysis» (Samuelson, 1947). 
 Implication of very active interventionist state: besides the Keynesian macro-economic policy and traditional regulatory and antitrust activities in troublesome areas of industrial organization, it also implies active state participation in areas of market failures, social costs and benefits.
 An economic management is considered as a search for the appropriate mix of monetary and fiscal policies, with relative weight of them being based on the relative elasticities of the IS and LM curves.  
 An important role is devoted to the empirical studies of the impact of different economic policies.
Extensive use of mathematics as a tool for economic analysis.

Development

The interpretation of J. Keynes suggested by neoclassical synthesis economists is based on the mixture of basic features of general equilibrium theory with Keynesian concepts. Thus, most models of neoclassical synthesis have been labelled as "pragmatic macroeconomics". Neo-Keynesians generally looked at labor contracts as sources of wage stickiness to generate equilibrium models of unemployment. Their efforts resulted in the development of the IS–LM model and other formal modelling of Keynes' ideas.

The development of the neoclassical synthesis started in 1937 with J. Hicks's publication of the paper Mr. Keynes and Classics, where he proposed the IS-LM scheme that has put the Keynesian theory into the more traditional terms of a simplified general equilibrium model with three markets: goods, money, and financial assets. This work marked the beginning of neo-Keynesian macroeconomics.  Later, in the 1940s–1950s, the ideas of J. Hicks were supported by F. Modigliani and Paul Samuelson. F. Modigliani in 1944 elaborated on J. Hicks publication, expanding the IS-LM scheme by incorporating the labor market into the model. P. Samuelson coined the term "neoclassical synthesis" in 1955 and put much effort into building and promoting the theory, in particular through his influential book Economics, first published in 1948. One of the main contributions of P. Samuelson made in the first edition of Economics was the 45-degree diagram (frequently known as "Keynesian cross"), that reconciled the competing economics of J.M. Keynes and neoclassical school by placing the neoclassical theory of price and income formation in the context of market competition with Keynesian macroeconomics as a theory of government intervention.

Many breakthroughs in the development of neoclassical synthesis had happened by the 1950s, with the creation of the IS-LM model by J. Hicks (1937) and A. Hansen (1949), the clarification of the role of the rigidity of nominal wages in the Keynesian model in the work of F. Modigliani (1944), the identification of the importance of the wealth effects and the role of public debt in the work of L.Metzler (1951), and D. Patinkin's clarification of the structure of the macroeconomic model (1956).

Legacy 

Through the 1950s, moderate degrees of government-led demand in industrial development and use of fiscal and monetary counter-cyclical policies continued and reached a peak in the "go go" 1960s, where it seemed to many neo-Keynesians that prosperity was now permanent. By the beginning of 1970s, the research program formulated after WWII was generally completed, and the neoclassical synthesis had proved to be very successful.  However, with the oil shock of 1973 and the economic problems of the 1970s, many economies experienced "stagflation": high and rising unemployment, coupled with high and rising inflation, contradicting the Phillips curve's normal behaviour.

As the scientific success of the neoclassical synthesis was largely due to its empirical success, this stagflation led to a collapse of the consensus around the neoclassical synthesis and it was attacked for its inability to explain events. Although neoclassical synthesis models were further expanded to include shocks, empirics exposed the main flaw that lay in the core of the theory: the asymmetry of considering individual agents as highly rational but markets as inefficient (particularly labour markets). R. Lucas and T. Sargent highly criticized the theory, claiming that predictions [based on this theory] were widely incorrect, and "that the doctrine on which they were based was fundamentally flawed is now a simple matter of fact".

Stagflation meant that both expansionary (anti-recession) and contractionary (anti-inflation) policies had to be applied simultaneously, a clear impossibility. This produced a "policy bind" and the collapse of the neoclassical-Keynesian consensus on the economy, leading to the development of new classical macroeconomics and new Keynesianism. Through the work of those such as S.Fischer (1977) and J.Taylor (1980), who demonstrated that the Philips curve can be replaced by a model of explicit nominal price and wage-setting with saving most of the traditional results, these two schools would come together to create the new neoclassical synthesis that forms the basis of mainstream economics today.

Following the emergence of the new Keynesian school in the 1970s, neo-Keynesians have sometimes been referred to as "Old-Keynesians".

See also
New classical macroeconomics
New neoclassical synthesis

General
History of macroeconomic thought
Mainstream economics

Notes

Neoclassical economics
Keynesian economics